The , also known as the Oriental Academy) was founded in 1754 by Empress Maria Theresa in Vienna.

History 
As early as 1674, on the orders of the Emperor, teaching in Turkish and Arabic began in Vienna. The Ottoman wars in Europe, as well as the economic and cultural exchanges, had made interpreters necessary, and scientific interest in the Orient awakened.

In 1754, Empress Maria Theresa founded the Oriental Academy at the suggestion of Wenzel Anton, Prince of Kaunitz-Rietberg, where Oriental Studies were taught alongside Turkish, Persian and Arabic. Most students entered the diplomatic service, where they were called "language youths" because of their age. One of the most famous students was Joseph von Hammer-Purgstall.

At the end of the 19th century, the Oriental Academy was reorganised and renamed the Consular Academy. After the Anschluss in 1938, the activities of the academy were strongly restricted by the new National Socialist rulers.

From 1941, the building was used as a military hospital for the German army. In 1947, it was bought by the American government. Initially, it served as an American legation, and from 1951 as the Embassy of the United States.

The academy reopened in 1964 as the Diplomatic Academy of Vienna in the building of the Theresianum.

Further reading 
 Victor Weiss von Starkenfels: Die kaiserlich-königliche orientalische Akademie zu Wien, ihre Gründung, Fortbildung und gegenwärtige Einrichtung. Gerold, Wien 1839 (Volltext).
 Erich Schlöss: Von den Sprachknaben zu den Anfängen der Orientalischen Akademie. In: Wiener Geschichtsblätter. Vol. 56, Nr. 1, 2001, .
 Marie de Testa, Antoine Gautier: L'Académie Orientale de Vienne, 1754–2002, une création de l'Impératrice Marie-Thérèse et Liste des jeunes de langues d'Autriche (1719–1903). In Marie de Testa, Antoine Gautier (ed.): Drogmans et diplomates européens auprès de la Porte ottomane (Analecta Isisiana. vol. 71). Éditions Isis, Istanbul 2003, .
 Oliver Rathkolb (ed.): 250 Jahre, von der Orientalischen zur Diplomatischen Akademie in Wien. 250 years, from the Oriental to the Diplomatic Academy in Vienna. 250 Années de l'Académie Orientale à l'Academie Diplomatique à Vienne. Studien-Verlag, Innsbruck among others 2004, .
 Hana Navrátilová, Roman Míšek: The Oriental Academy, Birth of a New Era of Austrian Diplomacy in the Orient. In Archiv Orientální, volume 71, Heft 2 (2003), .

References

External links 
 Roland Pietsch (2012): Ottokar Maria Freiherr von Schlechta-Wssehrd und seine Deutung persischer Dichtkunst, in Spektrum Iran. Zeitschrift für islamisch-iranische Kultur, 4/2012, 18 April 2013

Alsergrund
Political history of Austria
Organizations established in 1754
1947 disestablishments
Universities and colleges in Vienna